Elonichthys is an extinct genus of prehistoric bony fish. The genus is represented by several species from Carboniferous and Permian of Europe, Greenland, South Africa, and North America.

Species

See also

 Prehistoric fish
 List of prehistoric bony fish

References

Carboniferous bony fish
Permian bony fish
Mississippian fish
Mississippian fish of North America
Carboniferous fish of Europe
Permian fish of Europe
Permian fish of North America